The Château de l'Alba is a 15th-century castle, remodelled as a château in the 18th century, located in the commune of L'Albenc in the Isère département of France.

The château is closed to the public. It was partially listed as a monument historique in 1978.

See also
List of castles in France

References

External links
 

Châteaux in Isère
Monuments historiques of Isère